Philip H. Newcomb (born 1950s) is an American software engineer and CEO of The Software Revolution, Inc., known for his work in the field of formal methods of software engineering.

Biography 
Newcomb started his studies at the Indiana University in 1972, and obtained his BSc in Cognitive Psychology in 1976. In 1977 he did graduate work in computer science at the University of Washington and at Carnegie Mellon University. In 1984 he continued his studies at the Ball State University, where he obtained his MA in Computer Science in 1988. 

In 1983 Newcomb started as researcher at the Boeing Artificial Intelligence Center in Seattle, working in the field of formal methods for software engineering and artificial intelligence. He became senior principal scientist, and in 1989 director of the Software Reverse, Reengineering and Reuse Program. In 1995 he founded his own The Software Revolution, Inc., delivering solutions for software modernization.

In 2012 he was awarded the Stevens Award in recognition of his outstanding contributions to the literature or practice of methods for software and systems development.

Selected publications 
 Ulrich, William M., and Philip Newcomb. Information Systems Transformation: Architecture-Driven Modernization Case Studies. Morgan Kaufmann, 2010.

Articles, a selection:
 Newcomb, Philip, and Lawrence Markosian. "Automating the modularization of large COBOL programs: application of an enabling technology for reengineering." Reverse Engineering, 1993., Proceedings of Working Conference on. IEEE, 1993.
 Markosian, L., Newcomb, P., Brand, R., Burson, S., & Kitzmiller, T. (1994). "Using an enabling technology to reengineer legacy systems." Communications of the ACM, 37(5), 58-70.
 Newcomb, Philip, and Gordon Kotik. "Reengineering procedural into object-oriented systems." 2013 20th Working Conference on Reverse Engineering (WCRE). IEEE Computer Society, 1995.
 Newcomb, Philip. "Architecture-driven modernization (ADM)." 2013 20th Working Conference on Reverse Engineering (WCRE). IEEE Computer Society, 2005.

References

External links 
 Philip H. Newcomb at tsri.com

1950s births
Living people
American computer scientists
Information systems researchers
Indiana State University alumni
University of Washington alumni
Carnegie Mellon University alumni
Ball State University alumni